Phil ya Nangoloh (born on 22 September 1954 in Ogongo in the Omusati region) is a Namibian human rights practitioner. He heads the organisation Namrights, formerly Namibia's National Society for Human Rights (NSHR).

In search of better educational opportunities ya Nangoloh left Namibia in 1974. On his way into exile, he worked as a sheep and cattle herder in Angola and was later imprisoned in Zaire under the pretext of spying for Rhodesia. He was released at the request of Hisham Omayad of the United Nations Council for Namibia  and transferred to SWAPO in Lusaka. In November 1974 he became a member of the People's Liberation Army of Namibia (PLAN).

Later ya Nangoloh was sent to the Soviet Union where he received military training and completed a degree in radio engineering. By a visit to Finland, he came under renewed SWAPO suspicion of espionage and  before he was deported to SWAPO in Angola, he escaped from the Soviet Union. Then trying to apply for political asylum in Switzerland, failed. In 1981 he was deported to the U.S where he secured a grant as part of the UN Council for Namibia to study electrical engineering. The late 80s he returned to Namibia. There he was standing up, among other things for the release of detainees by SWAPO in exile.

In 1989 he founded the National Society for Human Rights of Namibia (NSHR) now known as NamRights which has since extensively reported on a variety of human rights issues.

References

Namibian activists
Living people
1954 births
People from Omusati Region
People's Liberation Army of Namibia personnel